The 1924 All England Championships was a badminton tournament held at the Royal Horticultural Halls, Westminster, England from March 4 to March 9, 1924.

Final results

Men's singles

Women's singles

References

All England Open Badminton Championships
All England
All England Open Badminton Championships in London
All England Championships
All England Badminton Championships
All England Badminton Championships